Trina Hosmer (born March 28, 1945) is an American cross-country skier. She competed in the women's 10 kilometre at the 1972 Winter Olympics. Hosmer is a graduate of the University of Vermont, where she was a member of the school's cross-country ski team.

Personal life
Hosmer was introduced to cross-country skiing at the University of Vermont by her boyfriend, and future husband, Dave Hosmer. Hosmer graduated from SUNY Potsdam in 1966 and earned her masters at Vermont in 1968. She and her husband later became faculty members at the University of Massachusetts, where she was a statistical software consultant. Hosmer was also a nationally caliber 1,500 meter runner, in addition to her cross-country skiing. She later became an active masters racer and Nordic ski instructor. Into her 70s, she had won over 30 gold medals at the Masters World Championships.  Hosmer won three gold medals in the 2019 Masters World Cup competition in Beitostølen, Norway.

References

External links
 

1945 births
Living people
American female cross-country skiers
Olympic cross-country skiers of the United States
Cross-country skiers at the 1972 Winter Olympics
Sportspeople from Watertown, New York
University of Vermont alumni
Vermont Catamounts skiers
21st-century American women